Laverdure is a surname. Notable people with the surname include:

Brittanee Laverdure (born 1982), Canadian wrestler
Claude Laverdure, Canadian diplomat
Claude Laverdure (1947–2020), Belgian comic book author
Donald Laverdure, American judge and politician
René Laverdure (1862–1914), French army officer